San Domenico is  a church in Orvieto, Umbria, central Italy.

It was begun in 1233, a few years after St. Dominic's death, and it is one of the first churches of the Dominican Order. The edifice had a nave and two aisles; what remains today are only the apse and the transept, after most of the church was demolished in 1932 to house the Female Academy of Gymnastics.

The church is notable for housing the desk used by  St. Thomas of Aquino for his lessons at Orvieto during his sojourn in the city (1263–1264), as well as the Monument to Cardinal De Braye, sculpted by Arnolfo di Cambio around 1282. As proved by restorations, the statues of the Madonna included in the latter is in fact a 2nd-century BC Roman one. Also in the church is the Petrucci Chapel, designed by Michele Sanmicheli in 1516-1523 under the choir. It has an octagonal plan and several sculptures.

The church was home to the San Domenico Polyptych by Simone Martini (1323–1324), now in the Orvieto Cathedral's Museum.

External links

Page at Orvieto municipality website 

Orvieto
Orvieto
Orvieto